Roth & Rau is a German solar energy company founded in 1991. It manufactures machines and equipment used in solar panel production. Its product portfolio includes PECVD coating plants.

References

External links

Solar energy companies of Germany
Companies based in Saxony
German companies established in 1991
German brands
Renewable resource companies established in 1991